The 2000 Citrus Bowl was a college football bowl game following the 1999–2000 football season. The game matched the Michigan State Spartans against the Florida Gators.

Michigan State came into the game with interim coach Bobby Williams, who took over on December 5, five days after Nick Saban departed to take over the LSU program.

Michigan State wide receiver Plaxico Burress caught a career-high 13 passes for 185 yards and three touchdowns and Paul Edinger kicked a 39-yard field goal as time expired to lead the ninth-ranked Spartans to a 37–34 victory over the No. 10 Gators.  Williams was later hired as the head coach of the Spartans.

Scoring summary

1st quarter
Michigan State – Paul Edinger 46-yard field goal 4:41 left. MSU 3 UF 0
Florida –  Travis Taylor 12-yard pass from Doug Johnson (Jeff Chandler kick) 0:58 left. UF 7 MSU 3

2nd quarter
Michigan State – Plaxico Burress 37 pass from Bill Burke (Paul Edinger kick) 13:24 left. MSU 10 UF 7
Michigan State – T.J. Turner 24-yard fumble recovery (Paul Edinger kick) 12:44 left. MSU 17 UF 7
Florida –  Travis Taylor 8-yard pass from Doug Johnson (Jeff Chandler kick) 8:12 left. MSU 17 UF 14
Michigan State – Paul Edinger 20-yard field goal 3:09 left. MSU 20 UF 14
Florida –  Doug Johnson 1-yard run (Jeff Chandler kick) 0:33 left. UF 21 MSU 20

3rd quarter
Michigan State – Plaxico Burress 21-yard pass from Bill Burke (2-pt conversion failed) 1:10 left. MSU 26 UF 21
Florida –  Travis Taylor 39-yard pass from Doug Johnson (2-pt conversion failed) 0:03 left. UF 27 MSU 26

4th quarter
Florida – Robert Gillespie 2-yard run (Jeff Chandler kick) 13:27 left. UF 34 MSU 26
Michigan State – Plaxico Burress 30-yard pass from Bill Burke (Gari Scott pass from Bill Burke) 10:46 left. MSU 34 UF 34
Michigan State – Paul Edinger 39-yard field goal 0:00 left. MSU 37 UF 34

Statistics

References

Florida Citrus Bowl
Citrus Bowl (game)
Florida Gators football bowl games
Michigan State Spartans football bowl games
Tangerine Bowl|Florida Citrus Bowl
Florida Citrus Bowl